WMIA may refer to:

 WMIA (AM), a radio station (1070 AM) licensed to Arecibo, Puerto Rico
 WMIA-FM, a radio station (93.9 FM) licensed to Miami Beach, Florida